Yavorovo may refer to the following places in Bulgaria:

Yavorovo, Kardzhali Province
Yavorovo, Stara Zagora Province